William Bunbury McClintock-Bunbury (1800 – 2 June 1866), known as William McClintock until 1846, was an Irish naval commander and Conservative politician.

Born William McClintock, he was the son of John McClintock and Jane, daughter of William Bunbury. John McClintock, 1st Baron Rathdonnell, was his elder brother, and the explorer Sir Francis McClintock his nephew. In 1846, he assumed by Royal licence the additional surname of Bunbury.

McClintock-Bunbury was a captain in the Royal Navy. He also sat as member of parliament for County Carlow between 1846 and 1852, and again between 1853 and 1862.

McClintock-Bunbury married Pauline Caroline Diana Mary, daughter of Sir James Stronge, 2nd Baronet, in 1842. They had two sons and two daughters. His eldest son Thomas succeeded his uncle as second Baron Rathdonnell in 1879. McClintock-Bunbury died in June 1866. His wife survived him by 10 years and died in January 1876.

References

External links 
 
 

1800 births
1866 deaths
Irish Conservative Party MPs
William Bunbury
Members of the Parliament of the United Kingdom for County Carlow constituencies (1801–1922)
Royal Navy officers
UK MPs 1841–1847
UK MPs 1847–1852
UK MPs 1852–1857
UK MPs 1857–1859
UK MPs 1859–1865
People from Howth